William Weeks may refer to:

 William Weeks (1813–1900), architect of the Church of Jesus Christ of Latter Day Saints
 William E. Weeks (1880–?), American attorney and politician
 William Farrar Weeks (1859–1914), coadjutor bishop of the Episcopal Diocese of Vermont
 William C. Weeks, architect in Wisconsin
 W. H. Weeks (William Henry Weeks, 1864–1936), architect

See also
 William Weekes (died 1806), lawyer and political figure in Upper Canada
 William Weekes (priest) (1867–1945), Dean of Bloemfontein, South Africa
 Willie Weeks, Bass guitarist